Transua Department is a department of Gontougo Region in Zanzan District, Ivory Coast. In 2021, its population was 112,842 and its seat is the settlement of Transua. The sub-prefectures of the department are Assuéfry, Kouassia-Niaguini, and Transua.

History
Transua Department was created in 2008 as a second-level subdivision via a split-off from Tanda Department. At its creation, it was part of Zanzan Region.

In 2011, districts were introduced as new first-level subdivisions of Ivory Coast. At the same time, regions were reorganised and became second-level subdivisions and all departments were converted into third-level subdivisions. At this time, Transua Department became part of Gontougo Region in Zanzan District.

Notes

Departments of Gontougo
States and territories established in 2009
2009 establishments in Ivory Coast